Come Around Again is the fifth full length studio album by Tony Lucca released on August 26, 2008.

Album information
Stylistically, the electric and rock songs on this album differed from Tony's prior acoustic releases. Lucca wrote or co-wrote most tracks on the album. It is not to be confused with Carly Simon’s hit album “Coming Around Again.”

Track listing
"Foxy Jane" (Tony Lucca, Mike Vizcarra) – 4:15
"Time & Time Again" (Tony Lucca, Brian Wright) – 3:10
"Close Enough" (Tony Lucca) – 4:35
"Givin' It All Away" (Tony Lucca, Mike Vizcarra) – 3:54
"Water Under The Bridge" (Tony Lucca, Brian Wright) – 3:23
"Come Around Again" (Tony Lucca) – 3:49
"Melancholy Collar" (Tony Lucca) – 4:28
"Father Time" (Tony Lucca, Mike Vizcarra) – 4:41
"Pretty Things" (Tony Lucca, Joe Firstman) – 5:41
"Maybe We" (Tony Lucca) – 4:08
"Wild Country" (Chris Whitley) – 3:04

Personnel
 Tony Lucca - vocals, guitar, steel guitar, piano, wurli
 Mike Vizcarra -  guitar 
 Michael Miley – drums 
 Robin Everhart - bass
 Chasen Hampton – background vocals
 C.C. White – background vocals
 Martin Flores - percussion
 Fil Krohnengold - organ
 Rob Giles – background vocals
 Tim Jones – background vocals
 Soda – piano & vocal cameo (Melancholy Collar)
 Brian Wright – background vocals
 Rowdy J – solo (Time & Time Again)
 Lukas Rossi – background vocals

2008 albums
Tony Lucca albums